Xi Coronae Borealis (ξ CrB) is a binary star system in the northern constellation of Corona Borealis. It is visible to the naked eye with a combined apparent visual magnitude of 4.85. Based upon an annual parallax shift of 17.78 mas as seen from the Earth, it is located about 183 light years from the Sun.

As of 2009, the pair had an angular separation of 91 mas along a position angle of 139.4°. The brighter member, component Aa, is an evolved K-type giant star with a stellar classification of K0 III. It is a red clump star that is generating energy by helium fusion at its core. The star has an estimated 2.36 times the mass of the Sun and has expanded to 8 times the Sun's radius. It is radiating 36 times the solar luminosity from its photosphere at an effective temperature of 4,853 K.

References

K-type giants
Horizontal-branch stars
Binary stars
Corona Borealis
Coronae Borealis, Xi
Durchmusterung objects
Coronae Borealis, 19
147677
080181
6103